Winogradskyella aurantiaca is a Gram-negative and motile bacterium from the genus of Winogradskyella which has been isolated from seawater from the coast of the Sea of Japan in Korea.

References

Flavobacteria
Bacteria described in 2018